Thomas James Kirk III, previously known by the pseudonym Terroja Lee Kincaid, is an American YouTube personality and podcast host. His channel, known as Amazing Atheist, rose to prominence through Kirk's criticism of religion. Kirk has since expanded his focus to other political and social issues.

Kirk previously had over 1 million subscribers on his main channel and has more than 445 million views in total. From 2014 until 2017, he was one of the hosts of Drunken Peasants, a YouTube news podcast focused on current events and interviews. In early 2018, Kirk started a new podcast "Deep Fat Fried" with two of his prior co-hosts which he still hosts today.

Early life
Kirk was born in Pasadena, California, though he was primarily raised in Mandeville, Louisiana. His father was Thomas James Kirk Jr. (July 1, 1946 – January 3, 2008), who operated several fraudulent higher education organizations and served three years in U.S. federal prison following a plea deal. At the age of sixteen, Kirk dropped out of high school with aspirations of being an author.

Career 

Kirk began posting videos on YouTube in November 2006. In 2007, he posted a video which included a warning about the mental instability of 18-year-old Pekka-Eric Auvinen, who would later perpetrate the Jokela school shooting.

In October 2011, a video of Kirk engaging in a sex act with a banana was leaked on the internet imageboard 4chan. Members from the 4chan community subsequently raided his channel, posting images from the video to his channel's comment section and Facebook page. In response, Kirk released a video to his channel called "Bananagate 2011" in which he said "the things that I did, I did because I enjoy them. I wasn’t ashamed of them when I was doing them in private, I see no reason to be ashamed of them now that they've been made public."

In 2012, Kirk was widely criticized for incendiary comments made on Reddit before he deleted his account. In an argument about trigger warnings, Kirk repeatedly stated that one of the participants, a self-described rape victim, should be raped again. Science blogger PZ Myers condemned these posts and went on to debate many of Kirk's past claims about feminism, writing that "this kind of thing has always been part of his YouTube schtick." After the incident, Kirk apologized to the Reddit user in a private message and later made a public apology. Kirk addressed the issue further in a 2014 YouTube video entitled, "Rape, Feminism, and The Amazing Atheist," in which he again apologized for the incident and explained the context in which it happened: his remarks were meant to be satirical commentary on trigger warnings.

In 2013, Kirk was a guest on a CNN panel, where he discussed the rise of atheism in America with Christian theologian William Lane Craig.

Kirk has made two appearances on The Joe Rogan Experience, one in January 2016 and another in March 2017. Kirk interviewed Milo Yiannopoulos for a Drunken Peasants podcast in 2016. In 2017 Breitbart, CPAC and Simon & Schuster severed their ties with Yiannopoulos based on comments from the episode where Yiannopoulos spoke positively of sexual relationships between boys and adult men. Kirk left Drunken Peasants at the end of 2017 with co-hosts Scotty Kirk and Paul Parkey Jr. and together they started their own podcast in early 2018, known as Deep Fat Fried.

In 2018, Kirk was criticized for a controversial tweet in which he claimed that Alicia Vikander's breasts were too small for her to play the video game character Lara Croft in the 2018 film Tomb Raider, and for later posting a video to his YouTube channel on the subject called "Lara Croft's b00bz - The Issue Of The Century".

On August 9th, 2022, Kirk's professional Twitter account was permanently suspended for use of the Spanish pejorative "gringo", with Twitter citing racism as the cause for suspension. It has since been restored.

References

External links 

 
 

21st-century atheists
American atheism activists
American podcasters
American YouTubers
Critics of creationism
Living people
Male critics of feminism
New Atheism
People from Mandeville, Louisiana
People from Pasadena, California
Video bloggers
YouTube channels launched in 2006

YouTube controversies
American critics of Islam
Critics of Christianity
Year of birth missing (living people)